The Ministry of National Defense (German: Ministerium für Nationale Verteidigung - MfNV) was the chief administrative arm of the East German National People's Army. The MND was modeled on the Ministry of Defense of the Soviet Union. The headquarters of the Ministry was in Strausberg near East Berlin. The Guard Regiment Hugo Eberlein provided security and guard services to the Ministry. The Ministry also had its own publishing house, .

Minister of Defence

The NVA was administered through the Ministry of National Defense, one of the principal branches of the national government. The ministers of National Defense were:

Hierarchy
The Minister of National Defence was assisted by a colloquium of deputy ministers who were also chiefs of certain key administrations within the ministry.

In 1987 the deputy ministers and their assignments were as follows: 
 Chief of the Border Troops of the German Democratic Republic;

 Chief of the Volksmarine (People's Navy);
 Chief of Technology and Weaponry;
 Chief of the Main Political Administration (Kessler's former post);
 Chief of the Air Forces of the National People's Army
 Chief of the Land Forces of the National People's Army; The Land Forces Command, located at Geltow was established on 1 December 1972 as a management body for the land forces.
 Chief of the Main Staff and secretary of the National Defense Council;
 Chief of civil defense; and
 Chief of rear services.

History

On January 18, 1956, the People's Chamber (the national legislature) passed a bill creating the NVA and the Ministry of Defense from the Chief Administration of Training of the Ministry of the Interior. This act formally acknowledged the existence of East Germany's armed forces. The NVA incorporated the Kasernierte Volkspolizei or KVP, Sea Police, and Air Police into a single armed force having three branches: ground, naval, and air. The Ministry of Defense was headed by Colonel General (Generaloberst) Willi Stoph, who was also minister of the interior. In 1987 Stoph was chairman of the Council of Ministers and a member of the SED Politburo. General Hoffmann, who was listed as first deputy minister of defense, attended the Soviet General Staff Academy in the mid-1950s and replaced Stoph as defense minister in 1960. Hoffmann held the post until his death in 1985. Concurrent with the establishment of the NVA as a legal entity was a return to public manifestations of German military traditions, with the addition of socialist elements. The training regimen for recruits approximated that of the former Wehrmacht, as did drill and ceremonies. New uniforms, whose cut but not colour (stone grey) were far closer to those of German World War II forces than to Soviet models, were introduced. Only the helmet represented a radical departure from World War II, but here too the design differed from the Soviet model.

The creation of the NVA addressed both internal and external security problems. Internally the physical appearance of the NVA spoke to the population in terms of their traditional German heritage and differentiated the NVA from the Soviet Army. In theory at least, East German citizens could have pride in their own army. The swift creation of the NVA as a force of more than 120,000 officers and other ranks practicing Prussian-style drill was a dramatic gesture of nationalism that was impossible for the world to ignore.

The creation of the Ministry of Defense and the NVA seemingly should have been a blow to the authority and prestige of the Ministry of the Interior. The bureaucratic impact of this action was mitigated by permitting Stoph to carry both portfolios for four years. In addition, police activities, both civil and secret, remained under the Ministry of the Interior, as did the Border Police. The Ministry of the Interior established its own Alert Units for the specific function of internal security. The Alert Units were militarily structured, fully motorized units with modern weapons and equipment. Garrisoned and trained in battalion-size units, they were capable of carrying out police tasks and other security functions. They have been used in major disturbances or in civil disasters affecting public order and safety.

Differentiation between the Ministry of Defense and the Ministry of the Interior was still in progress in the 1960s. On issue in this process was the subordination of the Border Police. On September 15, 1961, by order of the National Defense Council, the entire Border Police was transferred to the NVA and redesignated the Border Troops of the NVA. Various explanations for this shift have been offered by different authorities. The official reason stressed improvement in the level of training through closer relationship with the NVA and provision for reinforcement of the Border Troops with other NVA assets. The actual reason probably had more to do with standardization within the Warsaw Pact since similar reorganizations occurred in roughly the same time period in all the non-Soviet Warsaw Pact armies.

Organization
The organization of the East German Ministry of Defense, which closely follows the pattern of the Soviet Ministry of Defense, comprises several administrations and departments, among which there appeared to be a certain amount of overlapping authority. The chiefs of the major administrations and commands concurrently served as deputies to the defense minister.

In the mid-1980s, its complement of about 4,200 personnel had a military-to-civilian ratio of approximately three to one, in contrast to comparable Western ministries or departments that generally have a much higher proportion of civilian employees.

Approximately 100 Soviet liaison officers also were assigned to the East German ministry.

The Ministry of National Defense had the following subordinate executive bodies:

Headquarters
The Headquarters, was led by the Chief of Staff.

Land Forces Command

The Land Forces Command was established on 1 December 1972 as a management body created for the land forces. The seat was in Wildpark-West. The Friedrich Engels Guard Regiment provide security and guard services for the Land Forces Command headquarters.

Air Forces / Air Defense Command

The Air Force / Air Defense Command (LSK / LV) was created in 1956 for government air force and air defense. A year later, the administrations for the joint command LSK / LV-based Eggersdorf was established. It was led by the Chief of the Air Force Command / Air Defense.

People's Navy Command

People's Navy Command was based in Rostock-Gehlsdorf emerged from the administration of the naval forces. It was created in spring 1957. Following the award of the title "Volksmarine (People's Navy) on 3 November 1960 and was later renamed the People's Navy Command. It was led by the Chief of the Naval Forces Command/Marine People.

|- align="center" 
| colspan=7| Commander of naval forces

|- align="center" 
| colspan=7| Chief of the Volksmarine

Command GDR border troops

After the subordination of the German Border Police under the Ministry of National Defense on 15 September 1961, the units were designated as the NVA (Border Troops of the NVA). Once separated, the border troops of the army units were designated as the Border Troops of the GDR. The Command GDR border troops was based in Pätz. It was led by the Chief of the GDR border troops command.

Civil Defense Headquarters
The Civil Defense Headquarters, was led by the Head of the Civil Defense Headquarters.

The governing bodies still belonged to the Ministry Headquarters, the political headquarters and the areas of Bereiche Rückwärtige Dienste (Rear services) and Technik und Bewaffnung (equipment and armament).

Political Headquarters
The Political Headquarters, was led by the Chief of the Political Administration.

 Generalmajor Friedrich Dickel, 1 March 1956 to 24 August 1956
 Oberst Gottfried Grünberg, 25 August 1956 to 27 November 1957
 Generalmajor Rudolf Dölling, 28 November 1957 to 31 July 1959
 Vizeadmiral Waldemar Verner, 1 August 1959 to 31 December 1978
 Generaloberst Heinz Keßler, 10 January 1979 to 2 December 1985
 Generaloberst Horst Brünner, 10 December 1985 to 31 December 1989

Technology and Armament Department
The Technology and Armament Department, was led by the Chief of the range equipment and armament.

 Oberst Erwin Freyer, 1 March 1956 to 1 May 1957
 Generalmajor Rudolf Menzel, 1 May 1957 to 14 October 1959
 Generalmajor Friedrich Dickel, 15 October 1959 to 14 November 1963
 Generalmajor Werner Fleißner, 1 February 1964 to 27 December 1985
 Generaloberst Joachim Goldbach, 1 February 1986 to 18 April 1990

Rear Area Services
The Rear Area Services, was led by the Chiefs of the area Rear Services.

 Generalmajor Walter Allenstein, 1 March 1956 to 15 September 1972
 Generalleutnant Helmut Poppe, 15 September 1972 to 26 July 1979
 Generalleutnant Joachim Goldbach, 16 October 1979 to 31 January 1986
 Generalleutnant Manfred Grätz, 1 February 1986 to 31 December 1989
 Vizeadmiral Hans Hofmann, 1 January 1990 to 18 April 1990

The heads of the commands and the other governing bodies were usually also titled Deputy Minister of National Defense.

The MfNV has concluded agreements with almost all other ministries of the so-called GDR secret agreements. This agreement marked the prominent position of the NVA. Content of these agreements was the preferred treatment of the army in the food issue, to entering and use of forests and open spaces in the GDR.

See also
 List of German defence ministers
 Guard Regiment Hugo Eberlein provided security at the Ministry of National Defence
 Friedrich Engels Guard Regiment provided security at the Kommando Landstreitkräfte/Land Forces Command

References
 

 Klaus Naumann (Hrsg.): NVA - Anspruch und Wirklichkeit. (NVA - and reality). Mittler, Hamburg / Berlin / Bonn 1996, .
 Klaus Froh, Rüdiger Wenzke : Die Generale und Admirale der NVA. (The generals and admirals of the NVA). A Biographical Guide 4. Reprint. Ch. Links, Berlin 2000, 
 Bundesministerium für innerdeutsche Beziehungen (Hrsg.): DDR-Handbuch, Bd. (Federal Ministry for Intra-German Relations (ed.): DDR-Handbuch, 2nd Bd 3.Aufl. 3rd ed. Köln, 1985. Cologne, 1985. (S. 908) (P. 908)
 Hans-Werner Deim, Hans-Georg Kampe, Joachim Kampe, Wolfgang Schubert - Sachbuch „ Die militärische Sicherheit der DDR im Kalten Krieg“, Projekt+Verlag "The military security of the GDR during the Cold War", Project + Verlag Dr.Erwin Meißler, Hönow 2008,

External links
NVA Forum (in German)
 Nationale Volksarmee & the GDR Forum
AHF - Nationale Volksarmee (NVA)

National Defence
Military of East Germany
Germany, East
1956 establishments in East Germany
1990 disestablishments in East Germany